The 1986 U.S. Clay Court Championships (also known as the U.S. Open Clay Courts) was a men's Grand Prix and a women's Championship Series tennis tournament held in Indianapolis, Indiana in the United States. The tournament was the 18th edition as an open event and the last with a women's competition. Andrés Gómez and Steffi Graf won the singles titles and first–place prizes of $51,000 and $38,000 respectively.

The tournament was held in the spring (April 27–May 4) to coincide with the European clay court season but the weather was poor, attendances were down on those of previous years and none of the top–16 ranked male players competed.

Finals

Men's singles

 Andrés Gómez defeated  Thierry Tulasne 6–4, 7–6(7–1)

Women's singles

 Steffi Graf defeated  Gabriela Sabatini 2–6, 7–6(7–5), 6–4

Men's doubles

 Hans Gildemeister /  Andrés Gómez defeated  John Fitzgerald /  Sherwood Stewart 6–4, 6–3

Women's doubles

 Steffi Graf /  Gabriela Sabatini defeated  Gigi Fernández /  Robin White 6–2, 6–0

References

External links 

 
U.S. Clay Court Championships
U.S. Clay Court Championships
U.S. Clay Court Championships
U.S. Clay Court Championships
U.S. Clay Court Championships